Racing World was a spin-off service from Racing UK. It was launched on 8 March 2006  and featured coverage from the United States including such courses as Arlington Park and Churchill Downs. It broadcast on Sky channel 433 from 1730 to 0100 in the UK. The channel closed down on 24 August 2009.

Racing World showed nine hours of UFC programming, coverage began at 9pm on Saturday with all five episodes of the UFC's Top 100 Fights, then the UFC 100 countdown and then showing UFC 100 live to UK customers.

See also
Lists of television channels
Setanta Sports

References

Sports television channels in the United Kingdom